Commission v Ireland (1982) Case 249/81 is an EU law case, concerning the free movement of goods in the European Union.

Facts
The Irish Goods Council, a registered company, administered a ‘Buy Irish’ campaign. The outline of the campaign was set by government. The managing committee of the IGC had ten people appointed by the Minister for Industry. Funding came mostly from government. Trade had actually fallen by 6 per cent over the three years of the campaign. The Commission brought an action alleging that Ireland was in breach of (what is now) TFEU article 34, by restricting free movement of goods.

Judgment
The Court of Justice held that the ‘Buy Irish’ campaign of the government was contrary to TFEU article 34.

See also

European Union law

Notes

References
J Hojnik, ‘Free movement of goods in a labyright: Can Buy Irish survive the crises?’ (2012) 49 CMR 291
M Quinn and N Macgowan, ‘Coul Article 30 impose obligations on individuals?’ (1987) 12 ELR 163

Court of Justice of the European Union case law